The Fred Schnauber House is a historic house in Yankton, South Dakota. It was built in 1886 as a boarding house for Fred Schnauber's employees as well as railroad workers. Schnauber was a brewer and a bottler; he died in the 1920s. The house was later purchased by Martin Rathjen, and inherited by her great-nephew, John Coates, in the 1970s. It has been listed on the National Register of Historic Places since January 31, 1985.

References

External links

		
National Register of Historic Places in Yankton County, South Dakota
Houses completed in 1886
1886 establishments in Dakota Territory